Adodi is one of the oldest Black gay organizations in the United States. It was founded in Philadelphia in 1983 by Clifford Rowlands to bring together same-gender-loving men of African descent. Since its founding, Adodi has become one of the oldest movements of same-gender-loving men of African descent in history. It organized retreats for Black gay men partially to grieve during the early AIDS epidemic and partially to heal together. By 2003, the group had chapters in dozens of cities and suburbs. The organization currently has chapters in Detroit, Chicago, Philadelphia, New York, Dallas, and Washington, DC, many of which have regular programming and annual retreats.

Adodi is erroneously translated as a is the plural of ado, a Yoruba word to describe "a man who 'loves' another man"., however, as Yoruba has no form of pluralizing words by adding suffixes, and the yoruba word for love is "ife," it actually means "one who perform (anal) sex, with another man" and is a term used to describe gay people.

References

External links 

 Adodi - Official Website

1983 establishments in Pennsylvania
African-American history in Philadelphia
African-American LGBT organizations
LGBT culture in Philadelphia
LGBT organizations in the United States
Organizations established in 1983